Justin Thomas Newman (born 17 February 1995) is a Namibian rugby union player for the n national team and for the  in the Rugby Challenge. His regular position is centre or wing.

Rugby career

Newman was born in Windhoek.

References

External links
 

1995 births
Living people
Leopards (rugby union) players
Namibia international rugby union players
Namibian rugby union players
Rugby union centres
Rugby union players from Windhoek
Welwitschias players